The official White House photographer is a senior position appointed by the president of the United States to cover the president's official day-to-day duties. There have been twelve official White House photographers. Since the beginning of the presidency of Joe Biden, the position has been occupied by Adam Schultz.

The first official White House photographer was Cecil W. Stoughton, appointed by John F. Kennedy. Previously, official photographs had been taken by random military photographers. In the aftermath of Kennedy's assassination, it was Stoughton who was behind the lens for the iconic picture of Lyndon B. Johnson's inauguration on Air Force One, alongside Kennedy's widow, Jacqueline. Although Stoughton stayed on as a White House photographer for the next two years, it was Johnson's personal photographer, Yoichi Okamoto, who succeeded him in the role. For the first time ever, Okamoto was allowed access to the Oval Office.

Oliver F. Atkins was the official photographer for Richard Nixon, but was often restricted from taking photographs. However, Atkins' photograph of President Nixon and Elvis Presley is the most requested from the Library of Congress. The relationship between David Hume Kennerly and Gerald Ford was far more positive, as the official White House photographer returned to full-time activity. Kennerly's photograph of President Ford petting his Golden Retriever Liberty is arguably his most well known photograph from this era.

Jimmy Carter offered the job to Stanley Tretick, but was turned down by the photojournalist, who stated: "I didn't feel he wanted an intimate, personal photographer around him". As a result, Carter did not have a personal photographer, and it was not until 1981 that the official White House photographer came back. During Ronald Reagan's first term as President, the official photographer was Michael Evans. However, during his second term, new Chief of Staff Don Regan decided that all the White House photographers should have equal access (including Pete Souza, who was a staffer at the time), so no one was designated as Reagan's official photographer. Evans, who was leaving his post, was unhappy about not being succeeded and fired off a telegram to express his disapproval, to which Regan quickly replied, adamant in his decision. For George H. W. Bush's term as president, he appointed David Valdez. His most well known photograph was for Life, where Bush and his wife Barbara were in bed together, surrounded by their grandchildren.

During the 1990s, Bill Clinton's official photographer was Vietnam War veteran Bob McNeely, who chose to shoot his photographs in black and white. McNeely was barred in the fallout of the Lewinsky scandal, and eventually quit the position in 1998, citing a desire to be with his family. His association with the Clintons did not end there, as he was the official photographer for Hillary Clinton's senate campaign in 2000.

For George W. Bush's two terms as president, the official photographer was Eric Draper, and for Barack Obama's two terms as president, Souza returned to the White House. He has been associated with Obama since 2005, when working as a political photographer for CNN, was tasked with documenting Obama's first year as Illinois Senator, and stayed on afterward. Situation Room is Souza's best known work under the Obama administration.

Initially, it seemed that Donald Trump had not picked an official photographer for his presidential term, but Shealah Craighead was announced in the news media as such, a week after his inauguration. Craighead worked in the White House before, as the photographer for Dick Cheney and Laura Bush. She was campaign photographer for Sarah Palin and Marco Rubio, and was the official photographer at Jenna Bush's wedding.

List of official photographers

|-style="text-align:center;"
|colspan=5|Vacant1977–1981
|Jimmy Carter (Democratic)

|-style="text-align:center;"
|colspan=5|Vacant1985–1989
|Ronald Reagan (Republican)

Gallery

References

External links

White House Photographers (CBS News)
Obama's White House, by official photographer Pete Souza - in pictures (The Guardian)